Xingyi Wanfenglin Airport  is a class 3C airport serving the city of Xingyi in Guizhou province, China. It was opened in 2004. The airport is located 7 kilometers from the city center, and 15 kilometers from Wanfenglin National Geopark. Originally called Xingyi Airport, in April 2014 it was renamed Xingyi Wanfenglin Airport.

Airlines and destinations

See also
List of airports in China
List of the busiest airports in China

References

Airports in Guizhou
Xingyi, Guizhou
Airports established in 2004
2004 establishments in China